Enchanted Forest was a small amusement park operated in Porter, Indiana. The park operated from 1957 to 1991. Many rides were moved to Little Amerricka amusement park in Wisconsin after the park closed on August 2, 1991. The park became Splash Down Dunes Water Park in 1994. Splash Down Dunes itself closed down in 2009 after an ownership dispute; the original owner regained ownership in 2010 but the park remained  closed. Splash Down Dunes was bought by Seven Peaks Water Park and it re-opened on May 27, 2013, as Seven Peaks Water Park Duneland.

The location of the amusement park is at the intersection of U.S. Route 20 and Indiana State Road 49, north of Chesterton near the border of the Indiana Dunes National Lakeshore.

In June 2017, the park was closed by state officials due to dozens of people receiving chlorine chemical burns. Malfunctioning equipment was determined to be the root cause. At the time, Jo Penney, a spokeswoman for Seven Peaks, said, "the park will remain closed until all the deficiencies are rectified."

In 2019 the water park was sold. The new owner has plans to demolish the water park, and build an apartment Complex.

Seven Peaks Waterpark Duneland Attractions
Fears Tower – Four speed slides
Slingshot – A half-pipe water slide
Vortex – A bowl water slide
Dune Slides – Four body slides
Sandcastle Sliders – Three small body slides for kids
Sandbar Bay – Small pool with a water jungle-gym modeled after a pirate ship
Duneland Bay – A large wave pool

References

External links
 "Enchanted Forest Amusement Park" (Northwest Indiana Genealogical Society). Includes various images.

Amusement parks in Indiana
Defunct amusement parks in the United States
Buildings and structures in Porter County, Indiana
1957 establishments in Indiana
1991 disestablishments in Indiana
1994 establishments in Indiana
2009 disestablishments in Indiana
2013 establishments in Indiana
2019 disestablishments in Indiana
Amusement parks opened in 1957
Amusement parks closed in 1991
Amusement parks opened in 1994
Amusement parks closed in 2009
Amusement parks opened in 2013
Amusement parks closed in 2019